The 1993–94 Serie A season was the 60th season of the Serie A, the top level of ice hockey in Italy. 11 teams participated in the league, and Milan AC won the championship by defeating HC Bozen in the final.

Regular season

Playoffs

External links
 Season on hockeyarchives.info

1993–94 in Italian ice hockey
Serie A (ice hockey) seasons
Italy